Landscape with the Good Samaritan is a 1638 oil-on-oak-panel painting by Rembrandt. It is one of only six oil landscapes by the artist and with The Girl in a Picture Frame and The Scholar at the Lectern, it is also one of only three Rembrandt paintings in Polish collections. It shows the parable of the Good Samaritan from the Gospel of Luke.

It was bought at a Paris auction by Jean-Pierre Norblin de La Gourdaine and therefore passed into the Polish noblewoman Izabela Czartoryska's collection at the Dom Gotycki at Puławy. That collection was later moved to Krakow and so it was one of several painting looted by the Germans in 1939. After World War Two, thanks to research by the art historian Karol Estreicher, it was returned to Krakow and is now in the city's Czartoryski Museum.

Sources
http://archiv.ub.uni-heidelberg.de/artdok/volltexte/2010/1423/
Muzeum Czartoryskich. Historia i zbiory. Kraków 1998.
Painting description by the Royal Łazienki Museum 
Painting description by codart.nl

Landscape paintings
1638 paintings
Paintings by Rembrandt
Paintings based on New Testament parables
Collection of the Czartoryski Museum